Magnus Bækken (born 20 July 2001) is a Norwegian football striker who plays for Mjøndalen.

Hailing from Gol, he played for his local team and then the cooperation team Hallingdal. He made his debut for them in the 2016 3. divisjon and afterwards became a prolific goalscorer in the 4. divisjon. Picked up by first-tier club Mjøndalen in 2020, he did not play any games that season and was loaned out to Notodden without scoring there either. He made his Eliteserien debut in July 2021 against Odd.

References

2001 births
Living people
People from Gol, Norway
Norwegian footballers
Mjøndalen IF players
Notodden FK players
Eliteserien players
Association football forwards
Sportspeople from Viken (county)